A human rights commission, also known as a human relations commission, is a body set up to investigate, promote or protect human rights.

The term may refer to international, national or subnational bodies set up for this purpose, such as national human rights institutions or (usually temporary) truth and reconciliation commissions.

International

National or subnational bodies
National and sub-national human rights commissions have been established in a number of countries for the promotion and protection of their citizens' human rights, and most commissions are public bodies but with some degree of independence from the state. In other countries the ombudsman performs that role. The commissions below are state-sponsored except where indicated.

Africa

Asia-Pacific

Europe

Americas

See also

Truth and reconciliation commission
Ombudsman

References

National human rights institutions